Pinatuzumab vedotin (INN; development codes DCDT2980S and FCU2703) is a monoclonal antibody designed for the treatment of B-cell malignancies.

This drug was developed by Genentech/Roche.

References 

Monoclonal antibodies for tumors
Antibody-drug conjugates
Experimental cancer drugs